Jeanne or Joan of France may refer to:

 Jeanne III, Countess of Burgundy (1308–1349), a princess of France
 Joan II of Navarre (1312–1349), a princess of France
 Jeanne de Valois, Queen of Navarre (1343–1373), a princess of France
 Joan of Valois (1351–1371), a princess of France
 Joan of France (1391–1433), a princess of France
 Jehanne la Pucelle d'Ay de Domremy (1412–1431), a peasant, Saint Joan of Arc, Patron Saint of France
 Joan of France, Duchess of Bourbon (1435–1482), a princess of France
 Joan of France, Duchess of Berry (1464–1505), Saint Joan of Valois, a princess of France, Queen of France

See also
 Joan (disambiguation)
 Jeanne (disambiguation)
 Jehanne (disambiguation)